Yekateringofsky Municipal Okrug (known as Municipal Okrug #6 until 2011, is a municipal okrug of Admiralteysky District of the federal city of St. Petersburg, Russia. Population:  

It borders Fontanka in the north, Lermontovsky Avenue in the east, Obvodny Canal in the south, and Yekateringofka River in the west.

References

Admiralteysky District, Saint Petersburg